Jamila Wideman (born October 16, 1975) is an American lawyer, activist, and former professional basketball player. She is the daughter of author John Edgar Wideman.

Early life

Wideman was born on October 16, 1975. Her father, John Edgar Wideman, is an African-American author and a professor at Brown University. Her mother, Judith Ann Goldman, is a lawyer.

Until she was 10 years old, Wideman lived in Laramie, Wyoming, where her father taught Creative Writing at the University of Wyoming. In 1986, she moved to Amherst, Massachusetts, where her father accepted a tenured teaching position at the University of Massachusetts.

Education

High school

Wideman started on the Amherst Regional High School Varsity team for six straight years, beginning in 7th grade.

In her senior year, leading her team to the high school state championship, Wideman averaged 17 points, 6 steals, 6 assists, and 6 rebounds per game. In the State Championship game, she scored 27 points, had 14 steals and 8 assists, with 7 rebounds.

In 1992–1993, Wideman was named USA Today First Team High School All-American, Converse High School All-American, Nike High School All-American, Kodak High School All-American, New England High School Player of the Year, Massachusetts High School Player of the Year, and High School All-American by the WBCA. She participated in the WBCA High School All-America Game in 1993, scoring 10 points.

Her high school basketball team was the subject of a book, In These Girls Hope is a Muscle, by Madeleine Blais. While in high school, Wideman published poems on the complexities of her racial identity in her high school newspaper. Shortly after the Los Angeles uprisings of 1992, she wrote and published a poem titled Black.

College

Wideman attended Stanford University, where she continued with basketball. As a 5'6" point guard, Wideman was the smallest player on her college team.

While at Stanford University, she completed a double major, earning a B.A. in political science and African-American studies in 1997. After playing professional basketball, she earned a J.D. from New York University School of Law.

Professional basketball career

Wideman was selected as the 3rd overall draft pick by the Los Angeles Sparks in the inaugural WNBA draft of collegiate players in the summer of 1997.

Wideman played for four seasons in the WNBA, playing for the Los Angeles Sparks, Cleveland Rockers, and Portland Fire.

Wideman spent the 1999–2000 winter season in Israel, playing for the Elitzur Ramla club in the Israeli Basketball League. Her team won the national championship.

During the winter of 2005, Wideman reunited with college teammate Kate Starbird and played professionally in Ibiza, Spain.

Activism

Upon graduation from Stanford, and during the off-seasons of the WNBA, Wideman founded and directed the Stanford Athletic Alliance. In 1997, Wideman founded and implemented another youth program called "Hoopin' with Jamila". The program was funded by Nike. USA Today honored Wideman as the "Most Caring Athlete" in 1998. The program also earned the National Council on Crime and Delinquency "Community Award", given annually to programs that attempt to provide creative alternatives to juvenile incarceration.

In 2001, Wideman participated in the Connecticut Forum, where she shared the stage with Stanley Crouch, Anita Hill, Spike Lee, and Bill Russell to talk candidly about race.

Writing

Wideman collaborated with Juniper Lesnik to publish an article on playground basketball in the Sunday New York Times.

Post-basketball accomplishments 
Following her graduation from New York University Law School, Wideman began working as a staff attorney at Equal Justice Initiative (EJI) in Montgomery, Alabama, where she litigated on behalf of death sentences individuals in state and federal courts, and later became a staff attorney at the Legal Aid Society in New York City.

In September 2018, Wideman was hired by the NBA as Vice President of Player Development.

Career statistics

|-
| style="text-align:left;"|1997
| style="text-align:left;"|Los Angeles
| 28 || 14 || 22.6 || .236 || .194 || .794 || 2.0 || 3.7 || 0.9 || 0.0 || 1.8 || 3.0
|-
| style="text-align:left;"|1998
| style="text-align:left;"|Los Angeles
| 25 || 0 || 13.2 || .279 || .250 || .724 || 0.9 || 2.3 || 0.4 || 0.0 || 1.4 || 1.9
|-
| style="text-align:left;"|1999
| style="text-align:left;"|Cleveland
| 26 || 13 || 15.4 || .273 || .136 || .647 || 1.3 || 2.0 || 0.8 || 0.0 || 1.5 || 2.2
|-
| style="text-align:left;"|2000
| style="text-align:left;"|Portland
| 5 || 0 || 7.0 || .000 || — || — || 0.8 || 0.4 || 0.4 || 0.0 || 1.2 || 0.0
|-
| style="text-align:left;"|Career
| style="text-align:left;"|4 years, 3 teams
| 84 || 27 || 16.6 || .254 || .186 || .738 || 1.4 || 2.5 || 0.7 || 0.0 || 1.6 || 2.2

See also
List of select Jewish basketball players

References

External links 
 

1975 births
Living people
African-American basketball players
African-American Jews
American women's basketball players
Basketball players from Massachusetts
Cleveland Rockers players
Jewish American sportspeople
Jewish women's basketball players
Los Angeles Sparks draft picks
Los Angeles Sparks players
Parade High School All-Americans (girls' basketball)
Point guards
Portland Fire players
Basketball players from Wyoming
Stanford Cardinal women's basketball players
21st-century African-American sportspeople
21st-century African-American women
21st-century American Jews
20th-century African-American sportspeople
20th-century African-American women
Amherst Regional High School (Massachusetts) alumni